is a Japanese baseball player. He played formerly as a pitcher for the Chunichi Dragons on a developmental contract in the Western League. He is currently without a team.

On 30 March 2016 he was loaned to the Fukushima Hopes in the Baseball Challenge League.

On 1 October 2016, it was announced that he was deemed surplus to requirements at the Dragons, and therefore released.

References

External links
 Dragons.jp
 NPB.jp

1993 births
Living people
Baseball people from Mie Prefecture
Japanese baseball players
Nippon Professional Baseball pitchers
Chunichi Dragons players